The 1919 All-Big Ten Conference football team consists of American football players selected to the All-Big Ten Conference teams chosen by various selectors for the 1919 Big Ten Conference football season.

All Big-Ten selections

Ends
 Lester Belding, Iowa (ECP, FM, INS, MM, VH, WE-1)
 Paul Meyers, Wisconsin (FM, INS, MDN, MM, VH, WE-1)
 Frank Weston, Wisconsin (ECP, WE-2)
 Chuck Carney, Illinois (MDN, WE-2)

Tackles
 Duke Slater, Iowa (ECP, FM, INS, MDN [guard], MM, VH, WE-1)
 Charles Higgins, Chicago (FM, INS, MDN, MM, VH, WE-1)
 Burt Ingwersen, Illinois (ECP, WE-2)
 Trygve Johnsen, Minnesota (MDN)
 Angus Goetz, Michigan (WE-2)

Guards
 Lloyd Pixley, Ohio State (ECP, FM, INS, MM, VH)
 Jack Depler, Illinois (ECP, INS, MM, VH [center], WE-1 [center])
 Clarence Applegran, Illinois (MDN, VH, WE-1)
 William G. McCaw, Indiana (FM, WE-1)
 Dean W. Trott, Ohio State (WE-2)
 Harry Hunzelman, Iowa (WE-2)

Centers
 Charles Carpenter, Wisconsin (ECP, FM, INS, MM, WE-2)
 Williams, Minnesota (MDN)

Quarterbacks
 Gaylord Stinchcomb, Ohio State (ECP, FM, MM, WE-1)
 Aubrey Devine, Iowa (INS, MDN, VH)
 Robert H. Fletcher, Illinois (WE-2)

Halfbacks
 Chic Harley, Ohio State (ECP, FM, INS, MDN, MM, VH)
 Arnold Oss, Minnesota (ECP, FM, INS, MDN, MM, VH, WE-1)
 Laurie Walquist, Illinois (WE-2)
 Russell S. Williams, Indiana (WE-2)

Fullbacks
 Jack Crangle, Illinois (FM, INS, MM)
 Edmond R. Ruben, Minnesota (MDN, VH)
 Guy Lohman, Iowa (WE-1)
 Frank R. Willaman, Ohio State (ECP, WE-2)

Key

ECP = E. C. Patterson in Collier's Weekly

FM = Frank G. Menke

INS = International News Service selected by Luther A. Huston

MDN = Minneapolis Daily News by its sport editor, George A. Barton

MM = Malcolm McLaren in the Chicago Evening Post

VH = Victor Harris in the St. Paul Pioneer Press

WE = Walter Eckersall

Bold = consensus first-team selection by a majority of the selectors listed here

See also
1919 College Football All-America Team
1919 All-Western college football team

References

1919 Big Ten Conference football season
All-Big Ten Conference football teams